Sharpe's Eagle is the second in the series of Sharpe historical war television dramas, based on the 1981 novel of the same name.  Shown on ITV in 1993, the adaptation stars Sean Bean, Daragh O'Malley and Assumpta Serna.

Plot summary
In 1809, Sir Arthur Wellesley, commander of the British forces in the Iberian Peninsula, prepares to invade French-controlled Spain. He orders Lieutenant Richard Sharpe and his band of "chosen men" to accompany the arrogant, incompetent, newly arrived Sir Henry Simmerson and his South Essex Regiment on a mission to destroy a bridge vital to French troop movements. Simmerson, his nephew Lieutenant Gibbons and Lieutenant Berry despise Sharpe for his low birth. However, Major Lennox, who knows Sharpe from their days in India, and American-born Captain Leroy appreciate his military expertise.

The bridge is taken without resistance and Sharpe's men start to place explosives. When Simmerson spots a small French patrol on the other side of the river, he orders Lennox to take a small detachment and drive them off. Lennox strenuously objects, but obeys the command. His fears are realised when a hidden French cavalry unit overruns the British; Lennox is fatally wounded and the King's colours are lost. Sharpe and his men go to the rescue, while Simmerson panics and orders the bridge to be blown up, even though some of his men are still on the other side. Afterwards, the dying Lennox asks Sharpe for a French Imperial Eagle to wash away the shame of losing the colours.

Wellesley promotes Sharpe to captain for his part in the skirmish, instead of Gibbons (though he cannot guarantee that Sharpe will be able to keep his new rank). Enraged, Simmerson tells Berry to dispose of Sharpe. Berry deliberately provokes Sharpe by abusing Countess Josefina, a woman Sharpe had rescued from Gibbons and taken under his protection. To forestall a duel, Wellesley orders a night patrol to be led by Sharpe and Berry. They run into the French; during the fighting, Berry shoots Sharpe from behind, but is killed by Harper before he can finish the job.

The next day, the Battle of Talavera is fought. Simmerson, seeing a French column approaching his position, flees. Sharpe steadies the South Essex, much improved by his training, and leaves them under the command of Leroy. They succeed in stopping the French attack. At just the right moment, Sharpe and his riflemen attack the wavering French soldiers in the flank, sending them into headlong retreat. Sharpe captures the unit's Eagle, making him famous throughout Britain and ensuring that he remains a captain.

Afterwards, Sharpe plants the Eagle on Lennox's grave. Simmerson is protected by his influential friends and escapes punishment. Meanwhile, Josefina finds a new protector in Captain Leroy.

Cast
 Sean Bean as Richard Sharpe
 Daragh O'Malley as Sergeant  Patrick Harper
 Assumpta Serna as Comandante Teresa Moreno
 Brian Cox as Major Michael Hogan
 David Troughton as Lord Wellington
 Michael Cochrane as Sir Henry Simmerson
 Martin Jacobs as Colonel Lawford
 Katia Caballero  as Countess Josefina
 Michael Mears as Rifleman Francis Cooper
 John Tams as Rifleman Daniel Hagman
 Jason Salkey as Rifleman Harris
 Lyndon Davies as Rifleman Ben Perkins
 Paul Trussell as Rifleman Isaiah Tongue
 Gavan O'Herlihy as Captain Leroy 
 David Ashton as Major Lennox
 Neil Dudgeon as Lieutenant Gibbons
 Daniel Craig as Lieutenant Berry
 Nolan Hemmings as Ensign Denny
 Paul Bigley as Dobbs

It was David Troughton's second and last appearance as Sir Arthur Wellesley; due to illness, he was replaced by Hugh Fraser. Brian Cox would also leave the series after this film, due to poor working conditions in the Crimea. He was replaced by Michael Byrne playing a different character. Paul Trussell's character of Isaiah Tongue does not appear in later episodes.

Differences from the novel
While both the novel and the film follow a similar plot, many of the characters and events are altered from the former, often in order to minimise production costs. An incomplete list follows:

 In the novel, Sharpe brings with him a force of thirty riflemen to the South Essex, who remain with him throughout the course of the books. In the film, this number is trimmed down significantly, as only the Chosen Men and Sgt. Harper are featured.
 The character of Teresa had yet to be introduced by the time Sharpe's Eagle was written, appearing in the subsequent Sharpe's Gold. In the film, Teresa is present throughout many events of the plot, and the relationship between Sharpe and Josefina is scrapped as a result.
 The character of Captain Thomas Leroy is significantly different in the film, adding in a subplot that he made his fortune as a slave-trader. The Leroy in the novel has no connection with slave-trading.
 The bridge at Valdelacasa is an old Roman stone bridge in the novel, rather than the wooden one in the film. The battle that takes place there is also heavily altered; the Spanish take no part in the fighting, the battle between the South Essex and the French dragoons is of a much smaller scale, with only a few dozen men participating rather than hundreds on each side, and Sharpe's capture of the French cannon was written out.
 In the book, Gibbons is killed by Harper at Talavera when he attacks Sharpe, whereas in the film he flees with Simmerson and survives. The death of Berry in the film is an amalgamation of the deaths of Gibbons and Berry from the book: The novel has Sharpe luring Berry off to a secluded spot under the cover of a French attack and stabbing him through the throat with his sword.

References

External links
 
 Sharpe's Eagle at SharpeFilm.com

1993 British television episodes
1990s historical films
1990s war films
Films based on British novels
Films based on historical novels
Films based on military novels
Napoleonic Wars films
Eagle
War television films
Fiction set in 1809
Films directed by Tom Clegg (director)